Protodeltote is a genus of moths of the family Noctuidae. The genus was described by Ueda in 1984.

Species
 Protodeltote albidula (Guenée, 1852)
 Protodeltote distinguenda (Staudinger, 1888)
 Protodeltote inexpectata Ueda, 1984
 Protodeltote muscosula (Guenée, 1852)
 Protodeltote pygarga Hufnagel, 1766 – marbled white spot
 Protodeltote wiscotti (Staudinger, 1888)

References

Acontiinae